The 2007 Tennessee Lady Volunteers softball team was an American softball team, representing the University of Tennessee for the 2007 NCAA softball season. The team played their home games at Tyson Park. The team made it to the 2007 Women's College World Series, finishing second for their best finish in school history.

Roster

Schedule 

|-
!colspan=9| Louisville Slugger Tournament

|-
!colspan=9| 

|-
!colspan=9| Palm Springs Classic

|-
!colspan=9| Frost Tournament

|-
!colspan=9|

|-
!colspan=9| SEC Tournament

|-
!colspan=9|NCAA Knoxville Regional

|-
!colspan=9|NCAA Knoxville Super Regional

|-
!colspan=9|NCAA Women's College World Series

References

Tennessee Volunteers softball seasons
Tennessee
Tennessee Volunteers softball season
Tennessee
Women's College World Series seasons